"And the Bands Played On" is a single by heavy metal band Saxon from their 1981 album Denim and Leather. It peaked at number 12 on the UK Singles Chart and is Saxon's most successful single to date. The album version has a cold ending at 2:48, but the single version continues slightly longer to 2:53 and has a fade ending. The 7" single version has yet to appear on CD.

The lyrics, written by singer Biff Byford, are about Saxon's performance at the Monsters of Rock festival in 1980.

Personnel
Biff Byford – vocals
Graham Oliver – guitar
Paul Quinn – guitar
Steve Dawson – bass guitar
Pete Gill – drums

References 

1981 singles
Saxon (band) songs
1981 songs
Capitol Records singles